George Gordon may refer to:

By career

Military
George Henry Gordon (1823–1886), U.S. Army general
George Gordon (Civil War general) (1836–1911), Civil War General, Ku Klux Klan leader and U.S. Representative from Tennessee
George Grant Gordon (1836–1912), British Army officer and courtier

Political figures
George Gordon of Tulloch, commissioner for Aberdeen (Parliament of Scotland constituency)
Sir George Gordon (died 1690), commissioner for Banffshire (Parliament of Scotland constituency)
George Gordon (died 1691), burgh commissioner for Dornoch (Parliament of Scotland constituency)
Lord George Gordon (1751–1793), British politician
George Newcombe Gordon (1879–1949), Canadian Member of Parliament and cabinet minister
George Gordon (Ontario politician) (1888–1971), Member of Provincial Parliament
George Gordon (Canadian politician) (1865–1942), senator from Ontario
George William Gordon (1820–1865), Jamaican politician
George A. Gordon (1885–1959), American attorney and diplomat
George Anderson Gordon (1830–1872), American politician from Georgia
George John Robert Gordon (1812-1912), British diplomat

Religious figures
George N. Gordon (1822–1861), Protestant missionary to the South Pacific
George Gordon (priest) (1760–1845), Dean of Exeter and of Lincoln

Sciences
George Gordon (botanist) (1806–1879), gardener and horticultural writer 
George Gordon (horticulturalist) (1841–1914), British horticulturalist and writer, awarded the Victoria Medal of Honour
George Gordon (engineer) (1829–1907), Scottish Australian civil engineer
George Phineas Gordon (1821–1878), American inventor, printer and businessman

Sports
George Croughly Gordon (1850–1899), Scottish amateur international footballer
George Gordon (Australian footballer) (1902–1990), Australian rules footballer with Fitzroy
George Gordon (New South Wales cricketer) (1846–1923), Australian cricketer
George Gordon (Victoria cricketer) (1860–1946), Australian cricketer

Writers and academics
George Byron Gordon (1870–1927), American archaeologist
George Stuart Gordon (1881–1942), British academic and professor of poetry
George Gordon Byron, 6th Baron Byron (1788–1824), British Romantic poet more commonly known as Lord Byron

Others
George Gordon (animator) (1906–1986), American animator and director of cartoons for TV
George Gordon (scenic artist) (c. 1839–1899), in England and Australia
George Gordon (merchant), colonial American landholder
George Stanley Gordon (1926–2013), American advertising executive

By family

Members of the Scottish Clan Gordon

George Gordon, 2nd Earl of Huntly (before 1455–1501), Chancellor of Scotland, 1498–1501
George Gordon, 4th Earl of Huntly (1514–1562), Scottish nobleman
George Gordon, 5th Earl of Huntly (died 1576), Lord Chancellor of Scotland
George Gordon (bishop) (died 1588), bishop of Galloway
George Gordon, 1st Marquess of Huntly (1562–1636), Scottish nobleman
George Gordon, 2nd Marquess of Huntly (1592–1649)
George Gordon, 15th Earl of Sutherland (1633–1703), Scottish nobleman
George Gordon, 1st Earl of Aberdeen (1637–1720), Lord Chancellor of Scotland
George Gordon, 1st Duke of Gordon (1643–1716), Scottish peer
George Gordon, 3rd Earl of Aberdeen (1722–1801), Scottish peer
George Gordon of Gight (1741–1779), maternal grandfather of poet George Gordon Byron 
Lord George Gordon (1751–1793), politician, leader of Gordon riots
George Gordon, 9th Marquess of Huntly (1761–1853), Scottish peer
George Gordon, Lord Haddo (1764–1791)
George Gordon, 5th Duke of Gordon (1770–1836), Scottish nobleman, soldier and politician
George Hamilton-Gordon, 4th Earl of Aberdeen (1784–1860), Prime Minister of the United Kingdom
George Hamilton-Gordon, 5th Earl of Aberdeen (1816–1864), British peer and Liberal Party politician
George Hamilton-Gordon, 6th Earl of Aberdeen (1841–1870), Scottish peer and sailor
George Hamilton-Gordon, 2nd Baron Stanmore (1871–1957), British Liberal politician
George Gordon, 2nd Marquess of Aberdeen and Temair (1879–1965), 8th Earl of Aberdeen
George Ian Alastair Gordon, 8th Marquess of Aberdeen and Temair (born 1983)

See also 
George Hamilton-Gordon (disambiguation)